Eswatini Beverages Ltd (EBL) was a subsidiary of SABMiller until 10 October 2016 when it was acquired by Anheuser-Busch InBev. It is a beverage and brewing company in Matsapha, Eswatini. The company was formed in 1995 by the merger of Eswatini Breweries, Ngwane Breweries, and Eswatini Bottlers. EBL produces and markets soft drinks, beer, and other alcoholic drinks.

The Swazi beer produced is Sibebe Premium Lager named after the Sibebe rock, but other beers are brewed as well including Castle Lager. EBL dominates the beer market in Eswatini with a market share of 87%; in 2014 227 hl of lager beer were sold.

Retooling in 2013 led to a temporary beer shortage in Eswatini.

External links
 Eswatini Beverages Ltd, official website

References

Breweries of Africa
SABMiller
AB InBev
Companies established in 1995
Companies of Eswatini
Food and drink in Eswatini